Lorena Miranda Dorado (born 7 April 1991) is a Spanish female water polo player, born in Ceuta. At the 2012 Summer Olympics, she competed for the Spain women's national water polo team in the women's event, winning the silver medal. On 22 June 2019, she took office as Minister of Youth and Sport of the Government of Ceuta.

She has a degree in Physical and Sport Activity from the Pablo de Olavide University and a license as water polo coach.

See also
 List of Olympic medalists in water polo (women)
 List of world champions in women's water polo
 List of World Aquatics Championships medalists in water polo

References

External links
 

1991 births
Living people
Sportspeople from Ceuta
Spanish female water polo players
Water polo centre backs
Water polo players at the 2012 Summer Olympics
Medalists at the 2012 Summer Olympics
Olympic silver medalists for Spain in water polo
World Aquatics Championships medalists in water polo
Politicians from Ceuta
21st-century Spanish women
Pablo de Olavide University alumni